Lionel George Brown (23 April 1872 – 16 December 1938) was an English cricketer.  Brown was a right-handed batsman who fielded as a wicket-keeper.  He was born at Ancaster, Lincolnshire and educated at Bedford Modern School and Merton College, Oxford.

Brown made a single first-class appearance for Oxford University against the Gentlemen of England at University Parks in 1892.  In his match, he scored 8 runs in the university's first-innings, before being dismissed by Sammy Woods, while in their second-innings he was dismissed by John Ferris for 14 runs.  The Gentlemen of England won the match by 10 wickets.  Having played miscellaneous matches for Bedfordshire from 1891, Brown proceeded to make his Minor Counties Championship debut for the county against Wiltshire.  He made five further appearances to 1900, before playing two matches for Berkshire in the 1901 Minor Counties Championship against Oxfordshire and Monmouthshire.  He later made two appearances in the Minor Counties Championship for Bedfordshire, against Oxfordshire in 1902 and Cambridgeshire in 1903.

He died at Chorlton, near Stoke-on-Trent, Staffordshire, on 16 December 1938.

References

External links
Lionel Brown at ESPNcricinfo
Lionel Brown at CricketArchive

1872 births
1938 deaths
People from South Kesteven District
People educated at Bedford Modern School
Alumni of Merton College, Oxford
English cricketers
Oxford University cricketers
Bedfordshire cricketers
Berkshire cricketers
Wicket-keepers